The Renfe Class 353, formerly known as the T-3000 are a class of diesel-hydraulic locomotives built by Krauss-Maffei for express trains in Spain.

Background and design 

The class could be described as the bigger and better version of the Renfe Class 352, being similar in design, and from the same builder, but with more power and also two cabins to simplify operation.

The locomotives were fitted with coupling screws and Scharfenberg couplers. Auxiliary generators provide electrical power for the coaches.

Two sets of standard gauge bogies were also supplied, for cross border work (bogie exchange).

The locomotives were painted in red-silver.

Operations 
Their commission was related to the inauguration of the Talgo III RD (dual gauge) coached train from Madrid to Paris via Burgos, Vitoria, Hendaya and Bordeaux.

The trains also worked other international trains such as Barcelona to Geneva via Narbonne, Montpellier and Culoz, and the Paris to Barcelona; taking charge of the train after it passed the change of gauge to broad Iberian gauge at the stations of  Irún and Portbou.

Between Alcázar de San Juan and Rio Záncara, on 4 May 1978, 353-001 reached , for some time the class held the world speed record for diesel traction.

The mass electrifications in the eighties reduced the radius of action of both the Class 352 and Class 353, operating primarily in the axes Badajoz / Lisbon, Granada / Almería, Murcia / Cartagena and direct corridor from  Madrid to Burgos.

The standard gauge bogies found a use unexpected at the time of the locomotives inception – in 1991 was used to tow a Talgo Pendular train on the high speed Madrid to Seville AVE line.

The class was retired on 25 September 2003. The 353-005-2 is preserved in working condition at the museum of Vilanova.

Fleet details

See also 
Renfe Class 352, Renfe Class 354 - Predecessor and successor classes, built to a very similar design by Krauss-Maffei.

References

External links 

Photographs of the Class 353 fototrenes.tranvia.org

353
B-B locomotives
Talgo
Diesel locomotives of Spain
Renfe high-speed trains
Standard gauge locomotives of Spain
5 ft 6 in gauge locomotives
Passenger locomotives